Royler Gracie (born December 6, 1965) is a Brazilian-American retired mixed martial artist and Brazilian jiu-jitsu practitioner. Gracie ran the Gracie Humaitá school in Rio de Janeiro for many years under his father Helio's direction, and lives  and teaches in San Diego, California. Considered a legend of jiu jitsu and submission wrestling, Gracie is a member of both the IBJJF Hall of Fame, and the ADCC Hall of Fame.

Biography 
As son to the late Grandmaster, Helio Gracie and brother of Rickson and Royce Gracie, Royler is a member of the Gracie family. He holds an 8th degree red/black belt in the style pioneered by his family, Brazilian jiu-jitsu.

Prior to his retirement, Royler competed in the black-belt ranks for 20+ years. Royler is also a four-time World Jiu-Jitsu Champion in the Pena/Featherweight Black Belt Category and has placed in the Absolute Division.

Royler has a professional mixed martial arts record of five wins, five losses and one draw. His retirement fight came on September 14, 2011 at the age of 45 when he lost to Masakatsu Ueda via split decision.

In 2003, Royler Gracie faced Eddie Bravo in the quarterfinals of the ADCC tournament in the under 66 kg/145 lbs bracket. Royler was 38 years old at the time, but still regarded as one of the favorites to win the division. Bravo did exceptionally well against Royler, submitting him by way of triangle as the Gracie tried one of his trademarked knee sliding guard passes. Royler had a highly anticipated rematch against Eddie Bravo on March 29, 2014 at Metamoris III in a submission-only competition format. Despite a tight calf slicer submission attempt and multiple groin stretch attempts by Eddie the match concluded as a draw after the 20 minutes ran out due to the no points rule.

Media appearances 
In a season 3 episode of the Wildboyz, Steve-O and Chris Pontius visit Brazil and attend the Gracie Jiu-Jitsu school in Rio de Janeiro. Royler takes on Chris Pontius and chokes him out, while female student Leticia Ribeiro defeats Steve-O via armbar submission.

Published works 
Gracie has co-written three instructional books on Brazilian jiu-jitsu:

Brazilian Jiu-Jitsu: Theory and Practice with his cousin Renzo Gracie
Brazilian Jiu-Jitsu Submission Grappling Techniques with author Kid Peligro
Gracie Submission Essentials: Grandmaster and Master Secrets of Finishing a Fight with his late father Helio Gracie and Kid Peligro

Personal life 
Royler is married to Vera Lucia Ribeiro. They have four daughters.

On September 23, 2015 Royler became a citizen of the United States of America.

Instructor lineage 
Kano Jigoro → Tomita Tsunejiro → Mitsuyo "Count Koma" Maeda → Carlos Gracie → Helio Gracie → Royler Gracie

Mixed martial arts record 

|-
| Loss
| align=center| 5–5–1
| Masakatsu Ueda
| Decision (split)
| Amazon Forest Combat 1
| 
| align=center| 3
| align=center| 5:00
| Manaus, Brazil
|
|-
| Loss
| align=center| 5–4–1
| Hideo Tokoro
| Decision (unanimous)
| K-1 Premium 2006 Dynamite!!
| 
| align=center| 2
| align=center| 5:00
| Osaka, Japan
|
|-
| Loss
| align=center| 5–3–1
| Norifumi Yamamoto
| KO (punch)
| Hero's 3
| 
| align=center| 2
| align=center| 0:38
| Tokyo, Japan
|Hero's 2005 Lightweight Grand Prix quarter-final.
|-
| Win
| align=center| 5–2–1
| Koji Yoshida
| Decision (majority)
| Hero's 2
| 
| align=center| 2
| align=center| 5:00
| Tokyo, Japan
|
|-
| Win
| align=center| 4–2–1
| Kazuyuki Miyata
| Submission (triangle choke)
| Rumble on the Rock
| 
| align=center| 2
| align=center| 2:46
| Honolulu, Hawaii, USA
|
|-
| Loss
| align=center| 3–2–1
| Genki Sudo
| KO (punches)
| K-1 MMA ROMANEX
| 
| align=center| 1
| align=center| 3:40
| Saitama, Japan
|
|-
|  Draw
| align=center| 3–1–1
| Takehiro Murahama
| Draw (time limit)
| Deep – 1st Impact
| 
| align=center| 2
| align=center| 10:00
| Nagoya, Japan
|
|-
| Loss
| align=center| 3–1
| Kazushi Sakuraba
| Technical Submission (kimura)
| Pride 8
| 
| align=center| 2
| align=center| 13:16
| Tokyo, Japan
|  Royler demanded special rules: No stand ups, no judges
|-
| Win
| align=center| 3–0
| Yuhi Sano
| Submission (armbar)
| Pride 2
| 
| align=center| 1
| align=center| 33:14
| Yokohama, Japan
|
|-
| Win
| align=center| 2–0
| Noboru Asahi
| Submission (rear-naked choke)
| Vale Tudo Japan 1996
| 
| align=center| 1
| align=center| 5:07
| Urayasu, Japan
|  Royler demanded special rules: No strikes on ground
|-
| Win
| align=center| 1–0
| Ivan Lee
| Submission (rear-naked choke)
| Universal Vale Tudo Fighting 2
| 
| align=center| 1
| align=center| 1:33
| Brazil
|

References

External links 

Royler's web site
Academia Gracie de Jiu Jitsu

 

1965 births
Living people
Brazilian male mixed martial artists
Featherweight mixed martial artists
Lightweight mixed martial artists
Brazilian jiu-jitsu trainers
Sportspeople from Rio de Janeiro (city)
Brazilian people of Scottish descent
American people of Scottish descent
American sportspeople of Brazilian descent
Brazilian emigrants to the United States
Royler
World Brazilian Jiu-Jitsu Championship medalists
Mixed martial artists utilizing Brazilian jiu-jitsu
People awarded a coral belt in Brazilian jiu-jitsu
American mixed martial artists of Brazilian descent
ADCC Hall of Fame inductees